Football is the biggest and most popular sport in Paris, in terms of participants, spectators, economy, and media coverage. Racing Club de France, Red Star, CA Paris, and Club Français were all founding members of the 1932–33 Division 1, and the most successful club in the city is Paris Saint-Germain. The Stade de France is the home ground of the France national football team, and has hosted the Coupe de France final since the stadium's inauguration in 1998.

Derbies 
The last local derby in Ligue 1 was the Paris derby in the 1989–90 season between Paris Saint-Germain and Racing Paris. In total, the clubs met regularly for 5 seasons, in the 1984–85 season and from the 1986–87 to the 1989–90 seasons continuously. In the 21st century, most derbies have been played between Créteil, Paris FC, and Red Star in the second and third tiers.

History

Men's clubs

Women's clubs

Academies

See also
Football in France

References